Mehmet Güney (born 3 May 1936 in Siirt, Turkey) is an international judge and a Turkish diplomat.

Biography

Education 

Between 1954 and 1959, Mehmet Güney studied at the faculty of political science, then at the law faculty, of the Ankara University. He graduated from the Institute of Public Administration, and from the Nancy-Université in France.

International career 
In 1970, Güney participated to the first special session of the Commission on Narcotic Drugs, and to the 28th Human rights commission in 1971.

Personal life 

Mehmet Güney is married and has three children.

References

International Criminal Tribunal for Rwanda judges
International Criminal Tribunal for the former Yugoslavia judges
20th-century Turkish diplomats
Turkish judges
International Law Commission officials
Ambassadors of Turkey to Cuba
Ambassadors of Turkey to Singapore
Ambassadors of Turkey to Indonesia
1936 births
Living people
People from Siirt
Turkish judges of United Nations courts and tribunals